The government of the City of Chicago, Illinois, United States is divided into executive and legislative branches. The Mayor of Chicago is the chief executive, elected by general election for a term of four years, with no term limits. The mayor appoints commissioners and other officials who oversee the various departments. In addition to the mayor, Chicago's two other citywide elected officials are the City Clerk and the City Treasurer.

The City Council is the legislative branch and is made up of 50 aldermen, one elected from each ward in the city. The council takes official action through the passage of ordinances and resolutions and approves the city budget. Government priorities and activities are established in a budget ordinance usually adopted each November.

Organization 
Generally speaking, the mayor and city departments comprise the executive branch of the city government, and the city council comprises the legislative branch. However, the mayor does have some formal legislative functions such as being the presiding officer of the council and being able to break tie votes, and informally has dominated legislative activity since the late 19th century. On the other hand, the council has oversight authority over city departments. The city treasurer and city clerk are the only other directly elected positions in the city government, and are independent from the mayor's office and the council.

City Council

Mayor

City departments and agencies 
The below city departments and agencies operate as part of the executive branch, under the Office of the Mayor:

Finance and Administration 

 Department of Administrative Hearings
 Department of Finance
 Department of Fleet and Facility Management
 Department of Law
 Department of Human Resources
 Department of Innovation and Technology
 Department of Procurement Services
 Office of Budget and Management

Legislative and Elections 

 Board of Election Commissioners

City Development 

 Department of Cultural Affairs and Special Events
 Department of Housing
 Department of Planning and Development

Community Services 
 Board of Health
 Department of Public Health
 Commission on Human Relations
 Department of Family and Support Services
 Mayor's Office for People with Disabilities
 Public Libraries

Public Safety 

 Fire Department
 Police Board
 Civilian Office of Police Accountability
 Police Department
 Office of Emergency Management and Communications

Regulatory 

 Office of the Inspector General
 Department of Buildings
 Department of Business Affairs and Consumer Protection
 Chicago Animal Care and Control
 License Appeal Commission
 Board of Ethics

Infrastructure Services 

 Department of Aviation
 Department of Streets and Sanitation
 Department of Transportation
 Department of Water Management

City Clerk

City Treasurer

Other city agencies 
Other city-level government bodies include:

 The Chicago Board of Education, which oversees the Chicago Public Schools system, and whose members are appointed by the mayor
 The Chicago Housing Authority, a not-for-profit municipal corporation whose board of commissioners is appointed by the mayor
 The Chicago Water Department, oversees water utility. Water Commissioner is appointed by the Mayor and confirmed by the City Alderman. Services they handle includes: Metersave, Water Quality Reports, Sewer Regulations, Pay Water Bills Online, Conservation, Education,  Chicago Water Quality, as well as, Full Payment Certifications.
 The City Council Office of Financial Analysis (COFA) was created in 2015 to provide the City Council with independent analysis of the fiscal implications of the issues before it. COFA works with the City Council's Committee on Budget and Government Operations, and applies the tools of financial analysis to budget recommendations and forecasts, the City's annual audit, proposed public-private partnership agreements or asset leases, bond rating agency actions, and other matters as requested by Aldermen. COFA also provides an options report of potential cost-saving reforms and efficiencies.
 The Board of Trustees of the City Colleges of Chicago, whose members are appointed by the mayor with the approval of the council (except one elected student member)

Law

Chicago is a special charter municipality. The Journal of the Proceedings of the City Council of the City of Chicago is the official publication of the acts of the City Council. The Municipal Code of Chicago is the codification of Chicago's local ordinances of a general and permanent nature.

Politics

Other governments
Chicago is also part of Cook County. The Government of Cook County is primarily composed of the Board of Commissioners, other elected officials such as the Sheriff, State's Attorney, Treasurer, Board of Review, Clerk, Assessor, Recorder, Circuit Court judges and Circuit Court Clerk, as well as numerous other officers and entities. Illinois State police also operate in Chicago.

Other agencies that operate in the city of Chicago include the Chicago Transit Authority and the Metropolitan Pier and Exposition Authority, both of which were created by the state government of Illinois.

The United States Postal Service operates post offices in Chicago. The main Chicago Post Office is located at 433 West Harrison Street in the Near West Side community area. The post office is the only 24-hour post office in the United States.

See also
Sister cities of Chicago
Flag of Chicago
Government of Illinois

References

External links
 
 Data portal
 Municipal Code of Chicago from American Legal Publishing
 Chicago Decoded (unofficial Municipal Code) from the OpenGov Foundation